Lebedev-Kumach may refer to:

 Vasily Lebedev-Kumach, (1898–1949), a Russian poet and lyricist
 5076 Lebedev-Kumach, an asteroid